La Pintoresca Park is a neighborhood in Pasadena, California. It is bordered by Montana Street to the north, Washington Boulevard to the south, Fair Oaks Avenue to the west, and Los Robles Avenue to the east.

Landmarks
There is widespread commercial development on Fair Oaks Avenue and Woodbury Road. Notable landmarks in the neighborhood include Washington Middle School, Washington Elementary School, La Pintoresca Park, and Robincroft Castle.

Education
La Pintoresca Park is served by Washington and Altadena Elementary Schools, Washington and Eliot Middle Schools, and John Muir High School.

Transportation
La Pintoresca Park is served by Metro Local lines 256, 660 and 662, as well as Pasadena ARTS routes 20, 31, and 32.

Neighborhoods in Pasadena, California